Larry W. Campbell (born 28 February 1948) is a Canadian politician who was the 37th mayor of Vancouver, Canada, from 2002 until 2005, and a member of the Senate of Canada from 2005 until his retirement in 2023.

Before he was mayor, Campbell worked for the RCMP as a police officer, and in 1969, he was transferred to the Vancouver detachment. From 1973, he served as a member of the force's drug squad.

Starting in 1981, Campbell worked for the Vancouver District Coroner's office and in 1996 was appointed BC Chief Coroner, a post in which he served until 2000.

Early career 
Originally from Ontario and of Scottish descent, after high school Campbell's grandfather found him a job digging ditches for coaxial cable. Later he was a steel worker as a hand riveter in a boxcar plant in Hamilton.  He joined the RCMP on a bet with a Hamilton municipal police officer.  He spent about three years in uniform, but did not like to issue traffic tickets.  He was transferred to the drug squad in Vancouver where he worked in street enforcement mainly regarding heroin, including undercover work.  He started a drug squad in Langley.  Throughout his RCMP tenure, he never laid a single marijuana charge.

After serving in the RCMP for 12 years, the provincial chief coroner told him that the new Canadian Charter of Rights and Freedoms would negatively impact his drug enforcement efforts and convinced him to become Vancouver's coroner.  During the emerging AIDS pandemic, he became a strong advocate for progressive harm reduction policies, quipping that needle exchanges causing drug addiction "is like flies causing garbage".  He served for 20 years, retiring as chief coroner for the province.

As the city's former chief coroner, his life inspired a popular CBC Television drama called Da Vinci's Inquest. The show was later followed by a spinoff, Da Vinci's City Hall, in which the Da Vinci character followed his real-life counterpart into politics.

Mayor 
Campbell was elected mayor in the 2002 Vancouver municipal election as a member of the Coalition of Progressive Electors, by a large margin of 58% to 30% for his nearest opponent.

Shortly after Campbell's election, divisions began to emerge within his COPE party between a centrist group, led by Campbell and a more left-wing group.  On 14 December 2004, Campbell and councillors Jim Green, Raymond Louie and Tim Stevenson announced that they would form an independent caucus within COPE. The media quickly dubbed the bloc the "COPE Light" councillors (in contrast to the "COPE Classic" councillors). In 2005, the moderate group formed the centre-left Vision Vancouver party, but Campbell announced he would not run for re-election.

Senate 
On 2 August 2005, Prime Minister Paul Martin announced Campbell's appointment by Governor General Adrienne Clarkson as a Liberal senator. Campbell completed his term as mayor before taking up his seat in the Canadian Senate.

On 29 January 2014, Liberal Party leader Justin Trudeau announced all Liberal senators, including Campbell, were removed from the Liberal caucus, and would continue sitting as Independents. According to Senate Opposition leader James Cowan, the senators will still refer to themselves as Liberals even if they are no longer members of the parliamentary Liberal caucus.

On 6 April 2016, Campbell left the Senate Liberal Caucus to sit as an Independent and later joined the Independent Senators Group.  On 4 November 2019, he joined the Canadian Senators Group. On 24 October, 2022, Campbell left the CSG to sit as a non-affiliated senator.

See also
Da Vinci's Inquest
Quincy, M.E.

References

External links 
 
 
 CityMayors article
 'Legalize it, control it and tax the livin' hell out of it' (The Province)

Mayors of Vancouver
1948 births
Living people
Canadian senators from British Columbia
Liberal Party of Canada senators
Independent Canadian senators
Politicians from Brantford
Royal Canadian Mounted Police officers
Canadian coroners
21st-century Canadian politicians
Canadian Senators Group